Senator Weinberg may refer to:

Dan Weinberg (fl. 2010s), Montana State Senate
Loretta Weinberg (born 1935), New Jersey State Senate